The Independent Port of Strasbourg (P.A.S.) is a port on the Rhine river, in the city of Strasbourg, France. Created in 1926, it is a public transport hub under the control of the French transport ministry. The port is the second biggest river port of France after Paris, and the third largest port on the Rhine after Rotterdam and Duisburg. There are two terminals for containers equipped with three multimodal gantry cranes. The port extends over 100 km and comprises the main port of Strasbourg as well as the ports of Lauterbourg, Beinheim and Marckolsheim, Rhin à Seltz, Fort-Louis, Dalhunden, Drusenheim, Offendorf, Gerstheim and Rhinau.

Activity 
There are 320 companies located in this port, employing 1,300 persons. The traffic exceeded 6 billion tons for the first time in 1955. In 2009, the amount increased to 9 billion tons by river, 1.4 billion tons by train and 18 billion tons by truck. The main cargo is cereal, petrol products and gravel. The crane increased its capacity to 460 tons in 2008. The traffic of containers is expanding, with 425,000 TEUs handled in 2012, and 50% of them were carried by river. On September 11, 2010, the port inaugurated a second gantry crane in the north container terminal, which means the port now has 4 gantry cranes. A fifth crane should be installed to carry containers transported via rail at the end of 2013. In the future, the port would like to create a new container terminal with a gantry crane in the area of Lauterbourg.

The independent port of Strasbourg controls Batorama, which began in 1937 operating tours of Strasbourg by boat. The company has a fleet of 9 Dutch-style ships, able to pass under the bridges, which 700,000 tourists use each year.

Sites 
The estate of the port includes several sites which range over a distance of 100 km, which together represent an area of 1,060 hectares with 200 hectares of docks. These sites include the main port of Strasbourg and other sites such as Lauterbourg lying along the Rhine.

Notes and references 

http://www.strasbourg.port.fr/

Transport in Strasbourg
River ports
Autonomous and independent ports